Sir Vincent Frederick Floissac  (July 31, 1928 – September 25, 2010) was a Saint Lucian jurist and politician.  He was styled The Rt. Hon. Sir Vincent Floissac by virtue of his membership of the Privy Council of the United Kingdom.

Floissac was the first judge from St Lucia to sit with the Judicial Committee of the Privy Council.

Biography 
Floissac was born on St Lucia on and was educated at Saint Mary's College and University College London and was called to the Bar by Gray's Inn.

Floissac was the first President of the Saint Lucian Senate in 1979 and served as the acting Governor-General of Saint Lucia from April 30, 1987 until October 10, 1988. He has also served as Chief Justice and President of the Court of Appeal of the Eastern Caribbean Supreme Court, working in that capacity from November 1991 to July 1996. In this role, Floissac was the supreme judicial officer of the courts of Anguilla, Antigua and Barbuda, the British Virgin Islands, Dominica, Grenada, Montserrat, Saint Kitts and Nevis, Saint Lucia, and Saint Vincent and the Grenadines. He later served as a member of the Seychellois Court of Appeal from 1988 to 1991.  He has also represented Saint Lucia in several regional tennis competitions.

Following a lengthy bout with cancer, Floissac died on September 25, 2010 at the age of 82. and is buried in Castries City Cemetery.

See also
 Politics of Saint Lucia

References

 Obituary of Sir Vincent Floissac, The Daily Telegraph, 28 October, 2010

1928 births
2010 deaths
Alumni of University College London
Members of Gray's Inn
Members of the Privy Council of the United Kingdom
20th-century King's Counsel
Officers of the Order of the British Empire
Companions of the Order of St Michael and St George
Governors-General of Saint Lucia
Presidents of the Senate of Saint Lucia
Chief justices of the Eastern Caribbean Supreme Court
Saint Lucian judges
Saint Lucian judges on the courts of Seychelles
Deaths from cancer in Saint Lucia
Saint Lucian judges on the courts of Anguilla
Saint Lucian judges on the courts of Antigua and Barbuda
Saint Lucian judges on the courts of the British Virgin Islands
Saint Lucian judges on the courts of Grenada
Saint Lucian judges on the courts of Montserrat
Saint Lucian judges on the courts of Saint Kitts and Nevis
Saint Lucian judges on the courts of Saint Vincent and the Grenadines
Saint Lucian judges on the courts of Dominica
Saint Lucian judges of international courts and tribunals
Members of the Judicial Committee of the Privy Council